Rhapidinae is a subtribe of plants in the family Arecaceae found in Southeast Asia and the Mediterranean. Genera in the subtribe are:

Chamaerops – Mediterranean
Guihaia – Vietnam and China
Trachycarpus – southern China, northern Indochina, Himalayas

See also 
 List of Arecaceae genera

References

External links 

 
Arecaceae subtribes